Trhový Štěpánov (until 1912 Štěpánov) is a town in Benešov District in the Central Bohemian Region of the Czech Republic. It has about 1,400 inhabitants.

Administrative parts
Villages of Dalkovice, Dubějovice, Sedmpány, Střechov nad Sázavou and Štěpánovská Lhota are administrative parts of Trhový Štěpánov.

Geography
It lies in the Vlašim Uplands.

History
The first written mention of Štěpánov is from 1108. It was probably founded before 995. The settlement was promoted to a town in 1290. In 1912, Štěpánov was renamed Trhový Štěpánov.

Transport
The D1 motorway passes around the town.

Sights
The landmark of the town is the Church of Saint Bartholomew. It is a Gothic church from the 13th or 14th century, with Baroque modifications from around 1704. In 1856–1859, the wooden part of the tower was replaced by a brick in the pseudo-Gothic style.

Gallery

References

External links

Cities and towns in the Czech Republic
Populated places in Benešov District